R. Nithyashree is a Malaysian actress and makeup artist. She started her career as TV host for Astro Vaanavil's dance competition, Yuttha Medai All Stars. She made her acting debut in the film Vinay and Kambathe Kannemma. Before acting in the mainstream media, she appeared in a few music videos.

Selected filmography

Television

Movie
 2014 - Vinay
 2016 - Kambathu Kannama
 2017 -  Maama Machan 'ithu tamil padam'
 2021 -  Mr Peyii

References

Living people
People from Kuala Lumpur
Malaysian film actresses
Malaysian television actresses
Malaysian people of Indian descent
Malaysian people of Tamil descent
Malaysian female models
Malaysian expatriates in Singapore
Year of birth missing (living people)
21st-century Malaysian actresses